Rana FM was a Pashto language broadcast radio station operating from studios in an undisclosed location in Kingston, Ontario feeding transmitters in Kandahar and Kabul, Afghanistan.

History
Launched on January 6, 2007 during the 2001 Afghan war, the military-run station hired Afghan-Canadians as its on-air voice, presenting Bollywood and modern Afghan music, news, sports and public affairs programming with a distinct pro-NATO, anti-Taliban slant. Content was targeted to a 15- to 25-year-old demographic and included no commercial advertising.

The station was available as over the air FM radio in Afghanistan, via satellite (Eutelsat 70B, 70.5°E, 11210 MHz, horizontal, DVB-S, 6509 kilobits/second) and streamed on-line. Its signal was delivered to Afghanistan via satellite and fibre optic links.

As Canada's role in the Afghanistan War had largely ended by 2011, the station is no longer on the air.

Filmmaker Ariel Nasr's full-length documentary describing Rana FM, "Good Morning Kandahar", aired November 11, 2008 on CBC Newsworld and won the National Film Board of Canada Reel Diversity Competition.

See also
 Radio stations in Afghanistan
 Radio Free Afghanistan
 CFB Kingston

References

Radio stations in Afghanistan
Radio stations established in 2007
2007 establishments in Ontario
2011 disestablishments in Ontario
Radio stations disestablished in 2011
Defunct mass media in Afghanistan